Afonso Ferraz (born 26 August 1964) is an Angolan sprinter. He competed in the men's 100 metres at the 1992 Summer Olympics.

References

External links
 

1964 births
Living people
Athletes (track and field) at the 1992 Summer Olympics
Angolan male sprinters
Olympic athletes of Angola
Place of birth missing (living people)